Trybuna Śląska – regional newspaper published in Katowice during the years 1945–2004, one of the largest daily newspaper at that time in Poland. Number of copies of the issue amounted to 120 000 on weekdays and on weekends about 700 000, distributed throughout the three provinces: Katowice Voivodeship, Bielsko-Biała Voivodeship and Częstochowa Voivodeship.

Before 1990 published under the name Trybuna Robotnicza (Workers' Tribune), as the regional silesian authority of the ruling communist party (Polish United Workers' Party). After the fall of the communist dictatorship renamed at "Trybuna Śląska" (Silesian Tribune). As a result of selling off the resources of the party publishing house RSW "Prasa – Książka – Ruch" (Workers' Publishing Cooperative "Press – Book – Movement") the newspaper was for a short period co-ownership of Robert Hersant, took over it Górnośląskie Towarzystwo Prasowe (Upper Silesian Press Society), later property bought by the German press concern Verlagsgruppe Passau, publisher of competitive newspaper Dziennik Zachodni (Western Daily). Since 2000, investor gradually limit the scope and number of copies "Trybuna Śląska" and abolished it in 2004.

Sources
 Katalog prasy polskiej. Warsaw: Biuro Wydawnicze "RUCH", 1963. 
 Katalog Prasy - Radia - Telewizji '96 Województw: Bielskiego, Częstochowskiego, Katowickiego i Opolskiego. Edited by M. Jachimowski. Katowice: Śląski przegląd medioznawczy 1995–1996.
 Jachimowski, Marek. Raport. Media periodyczne w przestrzeni województwa śląskiego. Katowice: 2010.

Daily newspapers published in Poland
Mass media in Katowice